The 1994 Atlanta Braves season was the Braves' 124th in existence and their 29th in Atlanta. After trading the two-sport athlete Deion Sanders, experts predicted that the Atlanta Braves were going to have their worst season since 1935. The Braves' records reflect just how successful that year was, although it was curtailed due to the 1994–95 Major League Baseball strike. The Braves played a total of 114 games; they won 68 and lost 46. The Braves finished their 1994 season with a winning percentage of .596, ranking the Braves 3rd overall in MLB, although they were six games behind the Montreal Expos in the NL East.

Offseason
October 15, 1993: Jerry Willard was released by the Atlanta Braves.
October 25, 1993: Marvin Freeman was released by the Atlanta Braves.
November 18, 1993: Jarvis Brown was selected off waivers by the Atlanta Braves from the San Diego Padres.
November 24, 1993: Francisco Cabrera was released by the Atlanta Braves.
November 26, 1993: Charlie O'Brien was signed as a free agent with the Atlanta Braves.
February 10, 1994: Mike Bielecki was signed as a free agent with the Atlanta Braves.

Regular season

By Friday, August 12, the Braves had compiled a 68-46 record through 114 games. They were leading the 1994 NL Wildcard Race over the Houston Astros by 2.5 games. The Braves had scored 542 runs (4.75 per game) and allowed 448 runs (3.93 per game).

Braves' pitching was perhaps the best in the Majors in 1994: they gave up only 76 home runs in 114 games, the fewest home runs allowed among all 28 teams and they allowed only 929 hits, also the fewest among all 28 teams. Furthermore, they led the MLB in most strikeouts (865) and allowed the fewest runs (448) and earned runs (407).

Opening Day starters
Jeff Blauser
Ryan Klesko
Mark Lemke
Fred McGriff
Charlie O'Brien
Terry Pendleton
Deion Sanders
John Smoltz
Tony Tarasco

Notable transactions
May 29, 1994: Deion Sanders was traded by the Atlanta Braves to the Cincinnati Reds for Roberto Kelly and Roger Etheridge (minors).

Roster

Player stats

Season standings

Record vs. opponents

Batting

Starters by position
Note: Pos = Position; G = Games played; AB = At bats; H = Hits; Avg. = Batting average; HR = Home runs; RBI = Runs batted in

Other batters
Note: G = Games played; AB = At bats; H = Hits; Avg. = Batting average; HR = Home runs; RBI = Runs batted in

Pitching

Starting pitchers
Note: G = Games pitched; IP = Innings pitched; W = Wins; L = Losses; ERA = Earned run average; SO = Strikeouts

Relief pitchers
Note: G = Games pitched; W = Wins; L = Losses; SV = Saves; ERA = Earned run average; SO = Strikeouts

Award winners
 Greg Maddux, P, Gold Glove
 Greg Maddux, P, National League Cy Young Award
 Greg Maddux, The Sporting News Pitcher of the Year Award
 Fred McGriff, 1B, Major League Baseball All-Star Game MVP

1994 Major League Baseball All-Star Game
David Justice, OF, starter
Greg Maddux, P, starter
 Fred McGriff, 1B, reserve

Farm system

LEAGUE CHAMPIONS: Richmond

References

 1994 Atlanta Braves team page at Baseball Reference
 Atlanta Braves on Baseball Almanac

Atlanta Braves seasons
Atlanta Braves Season, 1994
Atlanta Braves